Big Island is an unincorporated community in Marion County, in the U.S. state of Ohio.

History
A post office called Big Island was established in 1829, and remained in operation until 1870. The community takes its name from Big Island Township. Besides the post office, Big Island had a hotel and several shops.

References

Unincorporated communities in Marion County, Ohio
Unincorporated communities in Ohio